The Corno Campascio (also known as Corno delle Ruzze) is a mountain of the Bernina Range (Alps), located on the border between Italy and Switzerland. It lies between the Val Malenco and the Val Poschiavo. The closest locality is Poschiavo on the east side.

References

External links
 Corno Campascio on Hikr

Bernina Range
Mountains of Graubünden
Mountains of Lombardy
Mountains of the Alps
International mountains of Europe
Italy–Switzerland border
Mountains of Switzerland
Two-thousanders of Switzerland
Poschiavo